7000 may refer to:

 7000 (number) and the 7000s
 The last year of the 7th millennium, an exceptional common year starting on Wednesday

See also

 7000 series (disambiguation)
 S7000 (disambiguation)